Terms for Syriac Christians are endonymic (native) and exonymic (foreign) terms, that are used as designations for Syriac Christians, as adherents of Syriac Christianity. In its widest scope, Syriac Christianity encompass all Christian denominations that follow East Syriac Rite or West Syriac Rite, and thus use Classical Syriac as their main liturgical language. Traditional divisions among Syriac Christians along denominational lines are reflected in the use of various theological and ecclesiological designations, both historical and modern. Specific terms such as: Jacobites, Saint Thomas Syrian Christians, Maronites, Melkites, Nasranis, and Nestorians have been used in reference to distinctive groups and branches of Eastern Christianity, including those of Syriac liturgical and linguistic traditions. Some of those terms are polysemic, and their uses (both historical and modern) have been a subject of terminological disputes between different communities, and also among scholars.

Territorially, Syriac Christians are divided in two principal groups: Syriac Christians of the Near East, and Syriac Christians of India. Terminology related to Syriac Christians of the Near East includes a specific group of ethnoreligious terms, related to various Semitic communities of Neo-Aramaic-speaking Christians, that are indigenous to modern Syria, Iraq, Iran, Turkey, Lebanon, Israel, Jordan, and Palestine.

Syriac Christians of the Near-Eastern (Semitic) origin use several terms for their self-designation. In alphabetical order, main terms are: Arameans, Assyrians, Chaldeans, Phoenicians and Syriacs. Each of those polysemic terms has a complex semantic history. First four of those names are expressing and implying direct connections with distinctive Semitic peoples of the Ancient Near East (ancient Arameans, ancient Assyrians, ancient Chaldeans, and ancient Phoenicians), while the fifth term (Syriacs) stems from a very complex etymology of the term Syria, and thus has a wide range of onomastic meanings, both historical and modern.

Terminology related to several groups of Arab Christians and other Arabic-speaking Christians who are adherents of Syriac Christianity, presents a specific challenge. Some of those questions, related to geopolitical affiliations and cultural Arabization, are of particular interest for the remaining communities of Syriac Christians in Arab countries of the Near East. In modern times, specific terminological challenges arose after 1918, with the creation of a new political entity in the Near East, called Syria, thus giving a distinctive geopolitical meaning to the adjective Syrian. Distinction between Syrian Christians as Christians from Syria in general, and Syriac Christians as Syriac-Rite Christians, is observed in modern English terminology.

Religious terms for Syriac Christians

Syriac Christians belong to several Christian denominations, both historical and modern. Various terms that are applied to those denominations are also used to designate Syriac Christian communities that belong to distinctive branches of the Christian denominational tree. Most important of those terms are: Jacobites, Saint Thomas Syrian Christians, Maronites, Melkites, Nasranis, and Nestorians, each of them designating a distinctive community, with its particular theological and historical traditions.

Historically, Syriac Christianity emerged in the Near East, among Aramaic-speaking communities that accepted Christianity during the first centuries of Christian history. Politically, those communities were divided between eastern regions (ruled in turn by Parthian and Persian empires), and western regions (ruled by the Roman, or Byzantine empire). That division created a specific notions of "East" and "West" within Syriac Christianity, with first term designating regions under Parthian/Persian rule, and second those under Roman/Byzantine rule.

After the emergence of major theological disputes and divisions (4th–7th century), regional distinction between eastern and western branches of Syriac Christianity gained additional significance. A majority of eastern Syriac Christians adhered to the Church of the East, while a majority of those in the western regions adhered to the Syriac Orthodox Church. At the same time, Aramaic-speaking Christian communities in some regions (like Byzantine Palestine) opted for the Chalcedonian Christianity. All of those divisions created a basis for the emergence of several denominational terms, created as endonymic (native) or exonymic (foreign) designations for distinctive Christian communities. Main of those terms were, in alphabetical order: Jacobites, Maronites, Melkites, and Nestorians. All of those terms are denominational, without ethnic connotations.

Syriac Jacobites
During the 5th and 6th century, Christological disputes related to monophysitism and miaphysitism led to the emergence of lasting divisions among Eastern Christians throughout the Near East. Miaphysite communities in the wider region of Syria (consisted of both Greek and Aramaic/Syriac adherents of miaphysitism) became known as Jacobites, after Jacob Baradaeus (d. 578), a prominent miaphysite metropolitan of Edessa who created a network of miaphysite ecclesiastical structures throughout the region. In later polemics between Christians, Jacobite appellation was often used by various opponents of miaphysitism as designation for heresy, thus creating basis for a complex history of the term. Various leaders of the miaphysite Syriac Orthodox Church have both rejected, or accepted the term. In polemic terminology, Jacobites were sometimes also labeled as Monophysites, a term they have always disputed, preferring to be referred to as Miaphysites.

Syriac Maronites
During the 7th century, renewed Christological disputes related to monoenergism and monothelitism led to the emergence of new divisions among Christians in the Near East. Some of those who accepted monothelite teachings became known as the Maronites, after their main center, the Monastery of Saint Maron, situated in northeastern region of modern Lebanon. Maronite community included both Greek-speaking and Aramaic-speaking adherents. During the following centuries, both Greek and Aramaic/Syriac traditions were gradually weakened by the process of Arabization. In modern times, renewed interest for patrimonial historical heritage among Catholic Maronites led to the revival of Aramaic/Syriac cultural traditions and Aramean identity.

Syriac Melkites
Official state support, provided by the Byzantine imperial authorities to adherents of Chalcedonian Christianity after 451, created a base for the emergence of a new, specific use of Aramaic terms that designated those who are loyal to the Empire, not just in the sense of their political loyalty, but also in regard to their acceptance of imperial religious policies. Throughout the Near East, all Christians who accepted state-backed Chalcedonian Christianity, became known as Melkites, a term derived from an Aramaic word melek (ruler, king, emperor), thus designating those who are loyal to the Empire and its officially imposed religious policies.

The term Melkites designated all loyalists, regardless of their ethnicity (Greeks, Arameans, Arabs etc.), thus including all of those Aramaic/Syriac-speaking Christians who adhered to Chalcedonian Christianity. Main communities of Aramaic/Syriac Melkites were those in Byzantine Palestine, Byzantine Phoenicia and western parts of Byzantine Syria. Since all of Melkite communities were dominated by Greek episcopate, position of Aramaic/Syriac Melkites within the Melkite community in general was somewhat secondary to that of Greek Melkites. That led to gradual decline of Aramaic/Syriac traditions, that were originally represented by literature created in Christian-Palestinian Aramaic language, also known as Melkite Aramaic. Decline of Aramaic/Syriac traditions and identity among Melkites was also influenced (since the 7th century) by gradual Arabization. In later centuries, several Melkite communities were split, thus creating additional distinctions, between Orthodox Melkites and Catholic Melkites. Within both communities, Aramaic/Syriac Melkites are today represented by small minorities.

Syriac Nestorians
Theological controversies that arose in the first half of the 5th century regarding the teachings of Nestorius (d.  450) resulted in the creation of a specific term: Nestorians, that was used to designate those Christians who shared his views in the fields of Christology and Mariology. That term was applied to all who agreed wit teaching of Nestorius, both within the borders of Roman Empire and beyond, regardless of their ethnic, linguistic or other backgrounds. Among Greek Christians, Nestorianism was eventually suppressed, but within some communities of Syriac Christians, particularly those beyond Byzantine imperial borders, support for Nestorius persisted, particularly within the Church of the East in the Sassanian Empire, where Nestorius came to be counted among the teachers of the Church and eventually became venerated as a saint. Since it was the only Christian denomination that practiced such reverence for Nestorius, the term Nestorians became commonly used as designation for adherents of the Church of the East in general, regardless of the fact that its official theological positions, finally formulated by the Babai the Great at the council of 612, was distinctive both in essence and terminology.

Throughout the medieval and early modern periods, the practice of labeling Syriac Christians of the Church of the East as "Nestorians" persisted among other Christian denominations, and even entered the terminology of Islamic scholars. Because of that, a specific duality was created within the Church of the East: reverence for Nestorius as a saint persisted, but Nestorian label was resisted if used as a derogatory term by opponents. In modern times, those questions were reexamined and reevaluated by scholars, who argued against improper uses of the term, and that position was also reflected in modern inter-denominational terminology, that avoids the use of any controversial terms. David Wilmshurst noted that for centuries "the word 'Nestorian' was used both as a term of abuse by those who disapproved of the traditional East Syrian theology, as a term of pride by many of its defenders [...] and as a neutral and convenient descriptive term by others. Nowadays it is generally felt that the term carries a stigma". Referring to the same issues, Sebastian Brock noted: "the association between the Church of the East and Nestorius is of a very tenuous nature, and to continue to call that Church 'Nestorian' is, from a historical point of view, totally misleading and incorrect – quite apart from being highly offensive and a breach of ecumenical good manners".

To designate converts from Nestorianism to Catholicism, some early western researchers have coined the term "Catholic Nestorians", but that combination was criticized as contradictory. The term occurred in works of several researchers.

Ritual distinctions
In terms of liturgical (ritual) distinctions, Syriac Christians are divided into: 

 Denominations of the West Syriac Rite
 Malankara Orthodox Church
 Maronite Catholic Church 
 Syriac Catholic Church 
 Syriac Orthodox Church, including
 Syriac Orthodox Church in India
 Malabar Independent Syrian Church
 Malankara Mar Thoma Syrian Church
 Syro-Malankara Catholic Church
 Denominations of the East Syriac Rite 
 Ancient Church of the East 
 Assyrian Church of the East 
 Assyrian Evangelical Church 
 Assyrian Pentecostal Church 
 Chaldean Catholic Church 
 Syro-Malabar Catholic Church

Regional terms for Syriac Christians
Since Syriac Christians live in various regions, both historical and modern, several terms that are generally applied to Christians of those regions are also used to designate local Syriac Christian communities. Various terminological issues, that are related to the proper use of regional and denominational designations, are often examined in scholarly literature, but some terminological issues proved to be particularly challenging for the news media.
 
To distinguish between regional, ethnic, linguistic and other meanings of various polysemic terms, scholars are analyzing both historical and modern aspects of their uses, but those complexities are rarely observed properly outside scholarly circles, by those who are not familiar with terminological distinctions. In the news media, Syriac Christians are often spoken of simply as Christians of their country or geographical region of residence, even when the subject of reporting is specifically related to Syriac denominations. Common terms such as: "Iraqi Christians", "Iranian Christians", "Turkish Christians", and particularly "Syrian Christians", are often used in a way that is seen by Syriac Christian communities in those countries as non-specific or even improper. Since some of those states (Syria) are officially defined as "Arab Republics", the Assyrian International News Agency interpreted the practice of regional labeling as "Arabist policy of denying Assyrian identity and claiming that Assyrians, including Chaldeans and Syriacs, are Arab Christian minorities".

Syrian designations

In modern English language, "Syrian" designations are most commonly used in relation to the modern state of Syria, or (in historical context) to the region of Syria. In accordance with that, English term "Syrian Christians" is commonly used to designate Christians of Syria in general, but the same term was also used to designate Christians of "Syrian" (Syriac) rites, regardless of their regional affiliation. Because of that, the distinctive term "Syriac" was introduced and favored by some scholars to designate the Syriac branch of Eastern Christianity, thus reducing Syrian designations to their primary (regional) meanings, related to Syria. Terminological transition from "Syrian" to "Syriac" designations is implemented gradually, primarily in scholarly literature, but duality of forms still persists, even in some modern scholarly works, thus resulting in a continuous variety of parallel uses (Syriac Christianity/Syrian Christianity, Christian Syriacs/Christian Syrians, East Syriac Rite/East Syrian Rite, West Syriac Rite/West Syrian Rite).

Syrian designations in particular may be confusing for an outsider, since someone may self-identify as both Syrian and Syriac. For example, Syriac Orthodox Christians from modern Syria are "Syriacs" as members of the Syriac Orthodox Church, but also "Syrians" as inhabitants of Syria. Since the historical region of Syria was much wider than modern Syria, in various writings related to earlier historical periods Syriac Christians could also be termed both as "Syriacs" by rite, and "Syrians" by region, even if their homelands are located outside the borders of modern Syria, but do belong within borders of the historical region of Syria. One of the most notable example is related to the city of Antioch on the Orontes, that was historical seat of the Patriarchate of Antioch and the capital city of Roman Syria, but since 1939 became part of modern Turkey. Therefore, earlier history of Syriac Christianity in such regions belongs to the Syrian regional history, but since those regions are now in Turkey, their heritage also belongs to the history of Christianity in Turkey.

In India, term "Syrian Christians" is still used as one of main designations for Saint Thomas Christians, who are traditionally using Syriac rites and Syriac language in their liturgical practices. Some authors even consider them to be "a distinct, endomagous ethnic group, in many ways similar to a caste. They have a history of close to two thousand years, and in language, religion, and ethnicity, they are related to Persian as well as West Syrian Christian traditions".

In recent years, English terminology (based on Syrian/Syriac distinctions) was made even more complicated, since several modern authors started to favor exonymic Turkish term Süryânî, by using it in texts written in English language, and thus promoting additional term for Syriac Christians.

Some similar questions arose in regard to the use of Assyrian designations as regional terms. John Joseph stated that in the English terminology of the 19th century, term "Assyrian Christians" initially designated Christians of geographical Assyria, but later transformed into 'Christian Assyrians'", thus gaining ethnic connotations, and also cited James Coakley, who remarked that "the link created between the modern 'Assyrians' and the ancient Assyrians of Nineveh known to readers of the Old Testament [...] has proved irresistible to the imagination".

Ethnic terms for Syriac Christians

Since Syriac Christians belong to various ethnic groups, native to the Near East and India, and also spread throughout diaspora, several terms that are applied to those groups are also used to designate Syriac Christian communities that belong to distinctive ethnicities.

Various groups among modern Syriac Christians of the Near East derive and uphold their ethnic identities by claiming descendancy from peoples of the Ancient Near East, such as: ancient Arameans, ancient Assyrians, ancient Chaldeans, and ancient Phoenicians. Since ethnic composition of the Near East suffered many substantial and successive changes during ancient, medieval, and modern times, all questions related to ethnic continuity are not only viewed as complex, but also treated as highly sensitive. Some of those questions proved to be very challenging, not only for distinctive communities and their mutual relations, but also for scholars from several fields related to the study of Syriac Christianity.

A common cultural denominator for all communities of Syriac Christians is found in the use of Aramaic languages, both historical (Edessan Aramaic: Classical Syriac) and modern (Neo-Aramaic languages), acknowledging in the same time, within the bounds of mutually shared cultural heritage, that ancient Aramaic language was accepted as lingua franca during the final two centuries of the Neo-Assyrian Empire.

A simplified list presents various self-identifications among modern Syriac Christians of the Near East, with regard to their ethnic or ethno-religious identity (in alphabetical order):
 Arameans (mostly endorsed by adherents of the Syriac Orthodox Church, and also by some in the Syriac Catholic Church and the Maronite Catholic Church)
 Assyrians (endorsed mostly by adherents of the Assyrian Church of the East, and also by some in the Ancient Church of the East, the Chaldean Catholic Church and the Syriac Orthodox Church)
 Chaldeans (endorsed mostly by adherents of the Chaldean Catholic Church)
 Phoenicians (endorsed by some in the Maronite Catholic Church, mainly in Lebanon)
 Syriacs (mostly endorsed as a distinctive ethnic identity by some in the Syriac Orthodox Church, and also by some in the Syriac Catholic Church)

Ethnic identity disputes

One of the main questions, related to ethnic identity of modern Syriac Christians of the Near East, stems from a dispute between two conflicting and mutually exclusive claims:

 Pan-ethnic claim: All of modern Syriac Christians of the Near East share the same ethnicity, and thus should be united under a single name.
 Poly-ethnic claim: Modern Syriac Christians of the Near East are divided into several, mutually distinctive ethnicities, each having its own name.

Proponents of pan-ethnic claims are further divided in two radicalized groups, that are mutually adversarial, and also deeply invested into mutual denialism:
 those who favor Pan-Aramean ethnic identity claim that all Aramaic-speakers are ethnic Arameans, thus denying the validity of all other competing identities, with particular focus on the denial of any Assyrian continuity. Pan-Aramean views are advocated by some activists, who are working mainly within Aramean ethnic and political organizations, such as the World Council of Arameans, and the Aramean Democratic Organization.
 those who favor Pan-Assyrian ethnic identity claim that all Aramaic-speakers are ethnic Assyrians, thus denying the validity of all other competing identities, with particular focus on the denial of a distinctive Chaldean ethnicity and Aramean continuity. Pan-Assyrian views are supported by Finnish scholar Simo Parpola, who stated in 2004: "In this context it is important to draw attention to the fact that the Aramaic-speaking peoples of the Near East have since ancient times identified themselves as Assyrians and still continue to do so", thus affirming his general pan-Assyrian positions within the wider field of Assyriology.

Contrary to radical pan-Aramean and pan-Assyrian claims, various proponents of poly-ethnic views are focused mainly on their own communities, recognizing at the same time the equality of other communities and the validity of their self-designations, thus creating a base for mutual acknowledgment and toleration. Advocates of such views are found in all groups, among moderate Arameans, Assyrians, Chaldeans and others. Prominent Assyrian scholar, professor Amir Harrak, who supports Assyrian continuity that is based on historical traditions of Assyrian heartlands, also acknowledges Aramean continuity that is based on similar historical traditions of some other (western) regions, thus demonstrating a balanced and moderate approach to those sensitive issues.

Most who support such poly-ethnic approach are ready to accept traditional "Syriac" designation as a cultural umbrella term, but without any suppression of distinctive ethnic identities. Thus, the term "Syriac peoples" (in plural) would designate a poly-ethnic group that includes distinctive peoples such as: modern Arameans, modern Assyrians, modern Chaldeans, and others. Such poly-ethnic pan-Syriac views are endorsed by some organizations, such as the European Syriac Union.

Similar preferences for the use of Syrian/Syriac designations as unifying terms were also manifested during the formative stages of national awakening, at the beginning of the 20th century. In 1910, Nestorius Malech (d. 1927) edited and published a work of his late father George Malech (d. 1909), that contained a chapter under the title: "The Arameans, Chaldeans, Assyrians and Syrians are One Nation and their Language is One". In order to explain the nature of those terms, the authors also claimed: "These four names are not national, but geographical significations". Emphasizing the common use of "Syrian language" among all those groups, the authors also advocated for the acknowledgement of a common "Syrian nation".

Such ideas, based on the use of "Syrian" designations, lost their practicality soon after 1918, when the foundations of modern Syria were laid, thus giving a distinctive geopolitical meaning to Syrian appellations, that became firmly tied to a country whose population was consisted mainly of Muslim Arabs. Later attempts to employ slightly distinctive Syriac designations came from foreign terminology, since native language had only one principal and widely accepted form (Suryaye/Suryoye) that simply meant: Syrians, and it took almost a century to accept Syrian/Syriac distinctions, but only in cases when self-designations are expressed in foreign languages. Thus became acceptable to use terms like: Syriac Christianity, Syriac language, Syriac literature, and Syriacs in general, but traditional native appellations (Suryaye/Suryoye) remained unchanged.

Views on endonymic (native) designations are also divided. Aramean activists are endorsing two terms: Ārāmayē and Sūryāyē, but they are emphasizing that the second term was historically accepted as an alternative self-identification only since the 5th century CE, under the influence of Greek terminology. Assyrian activists are endorsing the term Āṯūrāyē, and also accept the term Sūryāyē, but they claim that it always represented just a slightly shortened form of the main designation for Assyrians. In the Assyrian Neo-Aramaic language, both terms are thus used: Āṯūrāyē ("Assyrians") and Sūrāyē/Sūryāyē ("Syrians/Syriacs").

Disputes over ethnic identity began to intensify during the 1970s and gradually escalated to the point of mutual animosity that attracted the attention of foreign scholars and international institutions. Mutual denialism, particularly between radicalized proponents of pan-Aramean and pan-Assyrian claims, was perceived as being at odds with internationally endorsed principles, based on the notion that every ethnic community should be respected and allowed to choose its own self-designation. By the beginning of the 21st century, foreign scholars and institutions have shown an increasing tendency of taking neutral positions, that also affected terminology. Several attempts were made to create acceptable compound terms, by using various combinations of basic terms for Arameans, Assyrians, Chaldeans, and Syriacs in general. Some of those solutions were applied in the US census ("Assyrian/Chaldean/Syriac"), and in the Swedish census ("Assyrier/Syrianer").

Additional distinctions also appeared in regard to some other issues. Unlike the Assyrians, who emphasize their non-Arab ethnicity and have historically sought a state of their own, some urban Chaldean Catholics are more likely to assimilate into Arab identity. Other Chaldeans, particularly in America, identify with the ancient Chaldeans of Chaldea rather than the Assyrians. In addition, while Assyrians self-define as a strictly Christian nation, Aramaic organizations generally accept that Muslim Arameans also exist, and that many Muslims in historic Aramea were converts (forced or voluntary) from Christianity to Islam. An exception to the near-extinction of Western Aramaic are the Lebanese Maronite speakers of Western Neo-Aramaic; however, they largely self-identify as the Phoenicians (the ancient people of Lebanon) and not Arameans. Some Muslim Lebanese nationalists espouse Phoenician identity as well.

Assyria-Syria naming controversy
The question of ethnic identity and self-designation is sometimes connected to the scholarly debate on the etymology of "Syria". The question has a long history of academic controversy.

The terminological problem dates from the Seleucid Empire (323–150 BC), which applied the term Syria, the Greek and Indo-Anatolian form of the name Assyria, which had existed even during the Assyrian Empire, not only to the homeland of the Assyrians but also to lands to the west in the Levant, previously known as Aramea, Eber Nari and Phoenicia (modern Syria, Lebanon and northern Israel) that later became part of the empire. This caused not only the original Assyrians, but also the ethnically and geographically distinct Arameans and Phoenicians of the Levant to be collectively called Syrians and Syriacs in the Greco-Roman world.

The 1997 discovery of the Çineköy inscription appears to prove conclusively that the term Syria was derived from the Assyrian term 𒀸𒋗𒁺 𐎹 Aššūrāyu., and referred to Assyria and Assyrian. The Çineköy inscription is a Hieroglyphic Luwian-Phoenician bilingual, uncovered from Çineköy, Adana Province, Turkey (ancient Cilicia), dating to the 8th century BCE. Originally published by Tekoglu and Lemaire (2000), it was more recently analyzed by historian Robert Rollinger, who lend a strong support to the age-old debate of the name "Syria" being derived from "Assyria" (see Name of Syria).

The examined section of the Luwian inscription reads:

§VI And then, the/an Assyrian king (su+ra/i-wa/i-ni-sa(URBS)) and the whole Assyrian "House" (su+ra/i-wa/i-za-ha(URBS)) were made a fa[ther and a mo]ther for me,
§VII and Hiyawa and Assyria (su+ra/i-wa/i-ia-sa-ha(URBS)) were made a single "House".

The corresponding Phoenician inscription reads:

And the king [of Aššur and (?)]
the whole "House" of Aššur ('ŠR) were for me a father [and a]
mother, and the DNNYM and the Assyrians ('ŠRYM)

The object on which the inscription is found is a monument belonging to Urikki, vassal king of Hiyawa (i.e. Cilicia), dating to the 8th century BC. In this monumental inscription, Urikki made reference to the relationship between his kingdom and his Assyrian overlords. The Luwian inscription reads "Sura/i" whereas the Phoenician translation reads 'ŠR or "Ashur" which, according to Rollinger (2006), settles the problem once and for all.

Some scholars in the past rejected the theory of 'Syrian' being derived from 'Assyrian' as "naive" and based purely on onomastic similarity in Indo-European languages, until the inscription identified the origins of this derivation.

In Classical Greek usage, terms Syria and Assyria were used interchangeably. Herodotus's distinctions between the two in the 5th century BCE were a notable early exception. Randolph Helm emphasizes that Herodotus "never" applied the term Syria to Mesopotamia, which he always called "Assyria", and used "Syria" to refer to inhabitants of the coastal Levant. While himself maintaining a distinction, Herodotus also claimed that "those called Syrians by the Hellenes (Greeks) are called Assyrians by the barbarians (non-Greeks).

Greek geographer and historian Strabo (d. in 24 CE) described, in his "Geography", both Assyria and Syria, dedicating specific chapters to each of them, but also noted, in his chapter on Assyria:

Throughout his work, Strabo used terms Atouria (Assyria) and Syria (and also terms Assyrians and Syrians) in relation to specific terminological questions, while comparing and analyzing views of previous writers. Reflecting on the works of Poseidonius (d. 51 BCE), Strabo noted:

In the 1st century AD, Jewish historian Flavius Josephus wrote about various peoples who were descended from the Sons of Noah, according to Biblical tradition, and noted that: "Assyras founded the city of Ninus, and gave his name to his subjects, the Assyrians, who rose to the height of prosperity. Arphaxades named those under his rule Arphaxadaeans, the Chaldaeans of to-day. Aramus ruled the Aramaeans, whom the Greeks term Syrians". Those remarks testify that Josephus regarded all there peoples (Assyrians, Chaldeans, Arameans) as his contemporaries, thus confirming that in his time non-of those peoples were considered as extinct.

"Syria" and "Assyria" were not fully distinguished by Greeks until they became better acquainted with the Near East. Under Macedonian rule after Syria's conquest by Alexander the Great, "Syria" was restricted to the land west of the Euphrates. Likewise, the Romans clearly distinguished the Assyria and Syria.

Unlike the Indo-European languages, the native Semitic name for Syria has always been distinct from Assyria. During the Akkadian Empire (2335–2154 BC), Neo-Sumerian Empire (2119–2004 BC) and Old Assyrian Empire (1975–1750 BC) the region which is now Syria was called The Land of the Amurru and Mitanni, referring to the Amorites and the Hurrians. Beginning from the Middle Assyrian Empire (1365–1020 BC), and also in the Neo Assyrian Empire (935–605 BC) and the succeeding Neo-Babylonian Empire (605–539 BC) and Achaemenid Empire (539–323 BC), Syria was known as Aramea and later Eber Nari. The term Syria emerged only during the 9th century BC, and was only used by Indo-Anatolian and Greek speakers, and solely in reference to Assyria.

According to Tsereteli, the Georgian equivalent of "Assyrians" appears in ancient Georgian, Armenian and Russian documents, making the argument that the nations and peoples to the east and north of Mesopotamia knew the group as Assyrians, while to the West, beginning with Luwian, Hurrian and later Greek influence, the Assyrians were known as Syrians.

Ethnic identities

Assyrian identity

An Assyrian identity is today maintained by followers of the Assyrian Church of the East, the Ancient Church of the East, the Chaldean Catholic Church, Assyrian Pentecostal Church, Assyrian Evangelical Church, and Eastern Aramaic speaking communities of the Syriac Orthodox Church (particularly in northern Iraq, north eastern Syria and south eastern Turkey) and to a much lesser degree the Syriac Catholic Church. Those identifying with Assyria, and with Mesopotamia in general, tend to be Mesopotamian Eastern Aramaic speaking Christians from northern Iraq, north eastern Syria, south eastern Turkey and north west Iran, together with communities that spread from these regions to neighbouring lands such as Armenia, Georgia, southern Russia, Azerbaijan and the Western World.

The Assyrianist movement originated in the 19th to early 20th centuries, in direct opposition to Pan-Arabism and in the context of Assyrian irredentism. It was exacerbated by the Assyrian genocide and Assyrian War of Independence of World War I. The emphasis of Assyrian antiquity grew ever more pronounced in the decades following World War II, with an official Assyrian calendar introduced in the 1950s, taking as its era the year 4750 BC, the purported date of foundation of the city of Assur and the introduction of a new Assyrian flag in 1968. Assyrians tend to be from Iraq, Iran, southeast Turkey, northeast Syria, Armenia, Georgia, southern Russia and Azerbaijan, as well as in diaspora communities in the US, Canada, Australia, Great Britain, Sweden, Netherlands etc.

Assyrian continuity, embodied in the idea that the modern Assyrians are descended from the ancient Assyrians, is also supported by several western scholars, including: Henry Saggs, Robert Biggs, John Brinkman, Simo Parpola, and Richard Frye. It is denied by historian John Joseph, himself a modern Assyrian, and Semitologist Aaron Michael Butts.

Eastern Syriac Christians are on record, but only from the late nineteenth century, calling themselves Aturaye, Assyrians, and the region now in Iraq, northeast Syria and southeast Turkey was still known as Assyria (Athura, Assuristan) until the 7th century AD.

Christian missionary Horatio Southgate (d. 1894), who travelled through Mesopotamia and encountered various groups of indigenous Christians, stated in 1840 that Chaldeans consider themselves to be descended from Assyrians, but he also recorded that the same Chaldeans hold that Jacobites are descended from those ancient Syrians whose capital city was Damascus. Referring to Chaldean views, Southgate stated:

Rejecting assumptions of Asahel Grant, who claimed (in 1841) that modern Nestorians and other Christian groups of Mesopotamia are descendants of ancient Jewish tribes, Southgate remarked (in 1842):

Southgate visited Christian communities of the Near East sometime before the ancient Assyrian sites were rediscovered by western archaeologists, and in 1844 he published additional remarks on local traditions of ancient ancestry:

Remarks of Horatio Southgate have been noted and analyzed by several scholars, in relation to their significance for the question or Assyrian continuity. Some authors have noted that in the language of Southgate's Armenian informers, term Assouri (Asori) would designate Syrians in general, while Armenian specific term for "Assyrians" would be Asorestantsi. Such views were criticized by other authors. Noting that Southgate's reports do not state that Syriac Jacobites self‐identified as Assyrians, some authors have pointed out that Southgate himself did accept such notions, in opposition to Grant's theories. Systematic use of "Assyrian" designations for Syriac Christians gained wider acceptance in the context of later Protestant missions in the region, particularly after the establishment of the Archbishop of Canterbury's Mission to the Assyrian Christians (1886), that avoided the term "Nestorians" for adherents of the Church of the East.

Syriac identity
Syriac identity is manifested in several forms among modern Syriac Christians of the Near East. For some, those who self-identify as ethnic Syriacs (Suryoye) represent a distinctive ethnic group. For others, Syriacs are Arameans (from the pro-Aramean point of view), or Assyrians (from the pro-Assyrian point of view). In some communities, Syriac identity is thus closely merged with the modern Aramean identity, while among modern Assyrians, Syriac designation is viewed and accepted as a terminological variation, due to the etymological origin of the term.

Additional form of Syriac identity is manifested as a specific pan-Syriac identity, that is viewed as an all-encompassing pan-ethnic identity. Some international non-governmental organisations, such as the European Syriac Union, founded in 2004, promote the notion that such (pan-Syriac) identity represents and includes all other ethnic and ethno-religious identities, and thus unites all groups (Arameans, Assyrians, Chaldeans and others). Similar notions are supported by some political organizations, like the Syriac Union Party in Lebanon, and the Syriac Union Party in Syria, who also use Syriac designations as unifying terms.

Historically, endonymic (native) variants (Suryaya/Suryoyo) were commonly used as designations for linguistic (Syriac language), denominational (Syriac Christianity) and liturgical (Syriac rite) self-identification, thus referring to Syriac-speaking Christians of the Near East in general. In medieval times, those designations (Suryaya/Suryoyo) were often used as common terms of collective self-identification, but later emergence of modern Syria (after 1918) created some new challenges, in the fields of both regional and international terminology. In modern English terminology, term Syrians is most commonly used as a demonym for general population of the modern state of Syria. To distinguish themselves, modern Syriac Christians have thus accepted a more specific term Syriacs, that is particularly favored among adherents of the Syriac Orthodox Church and the Syriac Catholic Church. In 2000, the Holy Synod of the Syriac Orthodox Church officially recommended that in English language this church should be called "Syriac" after its official liturgical Syriac language.

Chaldean identity
What is now known to be Biblical Aramaic was until the second half of the 19th century called "Chaldean" (Chaldaic, or Chaldee), and East Syriac Christians, whose liturgical language was and is a form of Aramaic, were called Chaldeans, as an ethnic, not a religious term. Hormuzd Rassam applied the term "Chaldeans" to the "Nestorians", those not in communion with Rome, no less than to the Catholics. He stated that "the present Chaldeans, with a few exceptions, speak the same dialect used in the Targum, and in some parts of Ezra and Daniel, which are called 'Chaldee'."

In western terminology, the term "Chaldeans" was used in the 15th century, as designation for a group of Eastern Christians in Cyprus, who originally descended from Mesopotamia, and entered an ephemeral union with the Catholic Church in 1445, and later for those who entered into communion with the Catholic Church in their ancestral regions, between the 16th and 18th centuries.

Until at least the mid-nineteenth century, the name "Chaldean" was the ethnic name for all the area's Christians, whether in or out of communion with Rome. William F. Ainsworth, whose visit was in 1840, spoke of the non-Catholics as "Chaldeans" and of the Catholics as "Roman-Catholic Chaldeans". For those Chaldeans who retained their ancient faith, Ainsworth also stated that the name "Nestorians" was applied to them since 1681, to distinguish them from those in communion with Rome. A little later, Austen Henry Layard also used the term "Chaldean" even for those he also called Nestorians. The same term had earlier been used by Richard Simon in the seventeenth century, writing: "Among the several Christian sects in the Middle East that are called Chaldeans or Syrians, the most sizeable is that of the Nestorians". As indicated above, Horatio Southgate, who said that the members of the Syriac Orthodox Church (West Syrians) considered themselves descendants of Asshur, the second son of Shem, called the members of the divided Church of the East Chaldeans and Papal Chaldeans.

In 1875, Henry Van-Lennep stated that the term "Chaldean Church" is a "generic name" for Christian "Assyrians". Thus, speaking of the Nestorian Schism of 431, that occurred many centuries before the division of the Church of the East into those who accepted and those who rejected communion with the Catholic Church, he wrote: "At the schism on account of Nestorius, the Assyrians, under the generic name of the Chaldean Church, mostly separated from the orthodox Greeks, and, being under the rule of the Persians, were protected against persecution".

Although it was only towards the end of the 19th century that the term "Assyrian" became accepted, largely through the influence of the Archbishop of Canterbury's Mission to the Assyrian Christians, at first as a replacement for the term "Nestorian", but later as an ethnic description, today even members of the Chaldean Catholic Church, such as Raphael Bidawid, patriarch of the Chaldean Catholic Church from 1989 to 2003, accept "Assyrian" as an indication of nationality, while "Chaldean" has for them become instead an indication of religious confession. He stated: "When a portion of the Church of the East became Catholic in the 17th Century, the name given was 'Chaldean' based on the Magi kings who were believed by some to have come from what once had been the land of the Chaldean, to Bethlehem. The name 'Chaldean' does not represent an ethnicity, just a church... We have to separate what is ethnicity and what is religion... I myself, my sect is Chaldean, but ethnically, I am Assyrian". Before becoming patriarch, he said in an interview with the Assyrian Star newspaper: "Before I became a priest I was an Assyrian, before I became a bishop I was an Assyrian, I am an Assyrian today, tomorrow, forever, and I am proud of it".

That was a sea change from the earlier situation, when "Chaldean" was a self-description by prelates not in communion with Rome: "Nestorian patriarchs occasionally used 'Chaldean' in formal documents, claiming to be the 'real Patriarchs' of the whole 'Chaldean Church'." Nestorian Christians who "denied that Mary was the Mother of God and claimed that Christ existed in two persons. They consecrated leavened bread and used the 'Chaldean' (Syriac) language".

Hannibal Travis states that, in recent times, a small and mainly United States-based minority within the Chaldean Catholic Church have begun to espouse a separate Chaldean ethnic identity.

In 2005, the new Constitution of Iraq recognized Chaldeans as a distinctive community (Article 125). In 2017, the Chaldean Catholic Church issued an official statement of its Synod of Bishops, reafirming its commitment to a distinctive Chaldean identity:
 "As a genuine Chaldean people, we officially reject the labels that distort our Chaldean identity, such as the composite name "Chaldean Syriac Assyrian" used in the Kurdistan Region, contrary to the name established in the Iraqi constitution. We call upon our daughters and sons to reject these labels, to adhere to their Chaldean identity without fanaticism, and to respect the other names such as 'Assyrians', 'Syriacs', and 'Armenians'."

Chaldo-Assyrian identity

In modern political history, some attempts were made to overcome terminological divisions by creating some new, complex terms like: Chaldo-Assyrians or Assyro-Chaldeans. Those designations were aimed to provide a composite umbrella term, that would serve as a vessel for the promotion of an unified national identity. Term "Assyro-Chaldeans", as a combination of terms "Assyrian" and "Chaldean", was used in the Treaty of Sèvres, which spoke of "full safeguards for the protection of the Assyro-Chaldeans and other racial or religious minorities".

Soon after the implementation of political changes in Iraq, a conference was held in Baghdad on 22–24 October 2003, attended by representatives of Christian communities, both Assyrian and Chaldean, adopting a resolution that proclaimed national unity under a composite name "Chaldoassyrians", with a distinctive spelling "ChaldoAssyrians". The proposed name was not accepted by major political factions in Iraq. In 2005, the new Constitution of Iraq was adopted, recognising Assyrians and Chaldeans as two distinctive communities (Article 125). That constitutional provision was criticized by proponents of national unity.

Aramean identity

Aramean identity is advocated by a number of modern Syriac Christians, mainly those who are adherents of the Syriac Orthodox Church and the Syriac Catholic Church, as well as some who are adherents of the Maronite Catholic Church and the Melkite Catholic Church. They are mainly descended from western regions of the Near East, including various parts of modern Syria, Lebanon, Israel, and some southeastern parts of modern Turkey. Proponents of Aramean identity are also active throughout the Aramean diaspora, especially in some European countries, such as Sweden, Germany, Belgium, and the Netherlands.

Modern Arameans claim to be the descendants of the ancient Arameans, who emerged in the Levant in the 12th century BCE, and formed a number of local Aramean kingdoms, that were conquered by the Neo-Assyrian Empire in the course of the 8th and the 7th centuries BCE. They preserved their ethnic and linguistic identity throughout several periods of foreign domination, and later accepted Christianity.

In English language, they self-identify as "Arameans" (Oromoye) or "Syriacs" (Suryoye), sometimes combining those designations in compound terms such as "Syriacs-Arameans" or "Arameans-Syriacs". In Swedish, they call themselves Syrianer, and in German, Aramäer is a common self-designation.

In 2014, Israel decided to recognize the Aramean community within its borders as a national minority (Arameans in Israel), allowing most of the Syriac Christians in Israel (around 10,000) to be registered as "Aramean" instead of "Arab".

In 2015, during various manifestations that were commemorating centenary (1915–2015) of genocides committed by the Ottoman Empire against various Christian communities in the Near East, the World Council of Arameans (Syriacs) actively promoted issues related to Aramean/Syriac identity.

The self-identification of some Syriac Christians as Arameans is documented in Syriac literature. Mentions include that of the poet-theologian Jacob of Serugh, (c. 451 – 29 November 521) who describes St. Ephrem the Syrian (c. 306 – 373) as "He who became a crown for the people of the Aramaeans [armāyūthā], (and) by him we have been brought close to spiritual beauty". Ephrem himself made references to Aramean origins, calling his country Aram-Nahrin and his language Aramaic, and describing Bar-Daisan (d. 222) of Edessa as "The Philosopher of the Arameans", who "made himself a laughing-stock among Arameans and Greeks". Michael the Great (d. 1199) writes of his race as that of "the Aramaeans, namely the descendants of Aram, who were called Syrians".

Medieval scholar Gregory Bar Ebroyo (d. 1286) wrote that Aramaic/Syriac language "is divided into three dialects, one of the most elegant is Aramean/Aramaic, the language of Edessa, Harran, and outer Syria; next adjoining to it is Palestinian, which is used in Damascus, the mountain of Lebanon, and inner Syria; and the vulgar Chaldean Nabataean, which is a dialect of Assyrian mountains and the districts of Iraq."

However, references such as these to an Aramean ethnic and linguistic identity are scarce after the Middle Ages, until the development of Aramean nationalism in the 20th century.

During Horatio Southgate's travels through Mesopotamia, he encountered indigenous Christians and stated that Chaldeans consider themselves to be descended from Assyrians, but he also recorded that the same Chaldeans hold that Jacobites are descended from ancient Syrians of Damascus: "Those of them who profess to have any idea concerning their origin, say, that they are descended from the Assyrians, and the Jacobites from the Syrians, whose chief city was Damascus". Those ancient Syrians of Damascus, in terms of Biblical tradition, were ancient Arameans of Aram-Damascus.

During the 19th century, the Aramean question started to draw attention of western writers and scholars. In 1875, American missionary Henry Van-Lennep (d. 1889), who was working among Eastern Christians in the Near East, stated that Arameans are "better known as the Syrians, the Assyrians, and the Chaldeans", and also added: "The name Aramean is generally applied to all the inhabitants of the country which extends from the eastern boundary of Assyria to the Mediterranean, exclusive of Asia Minor proper and Palestine". He also divided Arameans in two branches, eastern ("the Eastern Arameans, or Assyrians, now called Chaldeans"), and western ("the Western Arameans, or modern Syrians"). These pan-Aramean views were accepted by some other western researchers, who also held that modern Syrians are descendants of Arameans. In 1888, British anthropologist George T. Bettany (d. 1891) thus noted that "The modern Semitic people occupying Syria are most accurately termed Aramaeans." In 1919, Irish orientalist Edmond Power (d. 1953) pointed to several questions related to Christian Arameans in modern Syria, noting that "It is in Northern Mesopotamia and Western Syria that the more ancient Aramean element is best preserved owing to the survival of Christianity in these districts".

Phoenician identity

Many of the Catholic Maronites identify with a Phoenician origin, as do much of the Lebanese population, and do not see themselves as Assyrian, Syriac or Aramean. This comes from the fact that present day Lebanon, the Mediterranean coast of Syria, and northern Israel is the area that roughly corresponds to ancient Phoenicia and as a result like the majority of the Lebanese people identify with the ancient Phoenician population of that region. Moreover, the cultural and linguistic heritage of the Lebanese people is a blend of both indigenous Phoenician elements and the foreign cultures that have come to rule the land and its people over the course of thousands of years. In a 2013 interview the lead investigator, Pierre Zalloua, pointed out that genetic variation preceded religious variation and divisions:"Lebanon already had well-differentiated communities with their own genetic peculiarities, but not significant differences, and religions came as layers of paint on top. There is no distinct pattern that shows that one community carries significantly more Phoenician than another."

However, a small minority of Lebanese Maronites like the Lebanese author Walid Phares tend to see themselves to be ethnic Assyrians and not ethnic Phoenicians. Walid Phares, speaking at the 70th Assyrian Convention, on the topic of Assyrians in post-Saddam Iraq, began his talk by asking why he as a Lebanese Maronite ought to be speaking on the political future of Assyrians in Iraq, answering his own question with "because we are one people.  We believe we are the Western Assyrians and you are the Eastern Assyrians."

Another small minority of Lebanese Maronites like the Maronites in Israel tend to see themselves to be ethnic Arameans and not ethnic Phoenicians.

However, other Maronite factions in Lebanon, such as Guardians of the Cedars, in their opposition to Arab nationalism, advocate the idea of a pure Phoenician racial heritage (see Phoenicianism). They point out that all Lebanese people are of pre-Arab and pre-Islamic origin, and as such are at least, in part, of the Phoenician-Canaanite stock.

Arab identity

Among modern Arab Christians, several communities belong to various branches of Syriac Christianity. Historical relations between those communities and the long-standing process of Arabization in the Near East is viewed as a complex and contentious issue. The Assyrian International News Agency interpreted promotion of Arab identity among Syriac Christians as an "Arabist policy" and mentioned in particular the dedication by the American-Arab Anti-Discrimination Committee of a webpage to the Maronite Kahlil Gibran, who is "viewed in Arabic literature as an innovator, not dissimilar to someone like W. B. Yeats in the West". The vast majority of the Christians living in Israel self-identify as Arabs, but the Aramean community have wished to be recognized as a separate minority, neither Arab nor Palestinian but Aramean, while many others wish to be called Palestinian citizens of Israel rather than Arabs. The wish of the Aramean community in Israel was granted in September 2014, opening for some 200 families the possibility, if they can speak Aramaic, to register as Arameans. Other Christians in Israel criticized this move, seeing it as intended to divide the Christians and also to limit to Muslims the definition of "Arab".

Saint Thomas Christians of India
The Saint Thomas Christians of India, where they are known as Syrian Christians, though ethnically unrelated to the peoples known as Assyrian, Aramean or Syrian/Syriac, had strong cultural and religious links with Mesopotamia as a result of trade links and missionary activity by the Church of the East at the height of its influence. Following the 1653 Coonan Cross Oath, many Saint Thomas Christians passed to the Syriac Orthodox Church and later split into several distinct churches. The majority, remaining faithful to the East Syriac Rite, form the Syro-Malabar Catholic Church, from which a small group, known as the Chaldean Syrian Church, seceded and in the early 20th century linked with what is now called the Assyrian Church of the East.

Names in diaspora

United States
In the United States, adherents of the Assyrian Church of the East (who originated from the Near East) are upholding Assyrian ethnic identity, but among followers of some other communities of Syriac Christians, like those of the Chaldean Catholic Church and the Syriac Orthodox Church, there are significant internal diversities, since parts of those communities uphold the Chaldean or Syriac/Aramean identity.

Several questions related to ethnic identities of Syriac Christians were also the subject of official analyses by the United States Congressional Joint Immigration Commission and United States Census authorities. In the 1980 Census, Arameans and Assyrians were classified under two distinctive codes (430 and 452), while in the 1990 Census, all communities, both ethnic and ethno-religious, were grouped under a single code (482).

During the 2000 United States census, Syriac Orthodox Archbishops n the US, Cyril Aphrem Karim and Clemis Eugene Kaplan, issued a declaration that their preferred English designation is "Syriacs". Within the official census classification, a specific solution was implemented by grouping all communities under a composite designation "Assyrian/Chaldean/Syriac". That decision was not welcomed by some Assyrian-American organizations, who sued the United States Census Bureau, but lost the case. Some Maronite Christians also joined this US census (as opposed to Lebanese American).

Sweden
In Sweden, adherents of the Assyrian Church of the East uphold the Assyrian identity, but among adherents of the Syriac Orthodox Church, who emigrated mainly from the Turkey during the 1960s and 1970s, internal disputes arose over the question of ethnic identity. Those among them, who preferred the indigenous designation Suryoyo, came to be known as Syriacs, (in Swedish: Syrianer). Among Syriacs, Aramean identity is also advocated. To resolve the problem, Syriac Orthodox Church created two parallel jurisdictions in Sweden (1994), one for Syriacs/Arameans, and other for Assyrians. When referring to both communities, Swedish authorities use the double term assyrier/syrianer.

See also

 Assyrians
 Assyrian continuity
 Assyrian nationalism
 Assyrian homeland
 Assyria
 Syria (region)
 Name of Syria
 Çineköy inscription
 Arameans
 Aram (region)
 Aram Nahrin
 Beth Nahrin
 Phoenicianism
 Chaldea
 Babylonia
 Mesopotamia
 Nabateans of Iraq
 Neo-Aramaic languages
 The Hidden Pearl

Citations

General sources 

 
 
 
 
 
 
 
 
 
 
 
 
 
 
 
 
 
 
 
 
 
 
 
 
 
 
 
 
 
 
 
 
 
 
 
 
 
 
 
 
 
 
  
 
 
 
 
 
 
 
 
 
 
 
 
 
 
 
 
 
 
 
 
 
 
 
 
 
 
 
 
 
 
 
 
 
 
 
 
 
 
 
 
 
 
 
 
 
 
 
 
 
 
 Michael, Sargon R. "Opinion & Reflections on Prof. John Joseph's Latest Book" Zinda magazine (2002)

Further reading 
 Alkhas, Wilfred (2006). "Neo-Assyrianism & the End of the Confounded Identity"
 Fred, Aprim (2004). "The Assyrian Cause and the Modern Aramean Thorn"
 Jammo, Sarhad. "Contemporary Chaldeans and Assyrians: One Primordial Nation, One Original Church", Kaldu.org
 Odisho, Edward (2003). "Assyrians, Chaldeans & Suryanis: We all have to hang together before we are hanged separately", Zinda Magazine
 Warda, William (2005). "Aphrim Barsoum's Role in Distancing the Syrian Orthodox Church from Its Assyrian Heritage"

Syriac Christians
Syriac Christians
Syriac Christians
Syriac Christians